Lawrence Joseph Connery (October 17, 1895 – October 19, 1941) was a United States House Representative from Massachusetts.

Life and career
Connery was born in Lynn, Massachusetts on October 17, 1895. He attended the local parochial and public schools, and St. Mary's College, St. Mary's, Kansas.

He was employed as a reporter for  The Lynn Item; served on the Mexican border in 1916 with Company A, 9th Massachusetts Infantry; served with Company A, Company A, 101st Infantry Regiment, 26th Division from March 25, 1917, until honorably discharged on March 24, 1919, with nineteen months service in France.

He went on to work as chief purser aboard a United Fruit Company ship (1919–23). From 1923-37, he was secretary (chief administrative assistant) for his brother, Congressman William Patrick Connery, Jr.

He graduated from Georgetown University Law School, Washington, D.C. in 1926; engaged in the office-supplies and printing business in 1934 in Lynn, Massachusetts.

Last years and death
Connery was elected as a Democrat to the Seventy-fifth Congress to fill the vacancy caused by the death of his brother, William. He was re-elected to the Seventy-sixth and Seventy-seventh Congresses and served from September 28, 1937 until his death from a heart attack in Arlington, Virginia on October 19, 1941, aged 46. He was interred in St. Mary's Cemetery, Lynn, Massachusetts.

See also
 List of United States Congress members who died in office (1900–49)

References

External links
 

1895 births
1941 deaths
Saint Mary's Academy and College alumni
Politicians from Lynn, Massachusetts
Georgetown University Law Center alumni
Massachusetts National Guard personnel
Democratic Party members of the United States House of Representatives from Massachusetts
20th-century American politicians
Catholics from Massachusetts